Veljo Kaasik (born 17 July 1938 in Tallinn) is an Estonian architect.

He was active architect between 1964 and 1993. He has designed public buildings, apartment houses, flats.

Since 1990s, he is the head of architecture and urban planning department of Estonian Academy of Arts.

In 2015, he was awarded with Order of the White Star, IV class.

References

Living people
1938 births
Estonian architects
Estonian Academy of Arts alumni
Academic staff of the Estonian Academy of Arts
Recipients of the Order of the White Star, 4th Class
Architects from Tallinn